Scott Richard Hanson (born June 24, 1971) is an American television anchor and reporter for NFL Network. He has served as sports reporter and anchor for several regional stations and was hired by NFL Network in 2006. He is currently the host of the NFL RedZone channel.

Early life and education
Hanson was born and raised in Rochester, Michigan. He graduated from the Bishop Foley Catholic High School in Madison Heights, Michigan in 1989. In high school, Hanson was the team captain and earned all-conference honors.

Hanson attended Syracuse University' S.I. Newhouse School of Public Communications and graduate cum laude in 1993.

Football career
Hanson played as a walk-on on the Syracuse Orange football team and played four seasons, two under head coach Dick MacPherson and two under Paul Pasqualoni. He played as a long snapper, wide receiver and defensive back on the scout team, and was a teammate of future Pro Football Hall of Famer Marvin Harrison. He was Scout Team Player of the Year in 1992.

Professional career
While attending Syracuse, Hanson worked as a summer intern at WXYZ-TV in Southfield, Michigan.

In 1993 Hanson landed his first job as an anchor and reporter for NBC affiliate WPBN-TV in Traverse City, Michigan.  He then moved to Springfield, Illinois, in 1994, sticking with NBC to be a reporter for WICS-TV. Next, Hanson headed south to ABC affiliate WFTS-TV in Tampa, Florida, where he covered the Tampa Bay Buccaneers rise under coach Tony Dungy.

Hanson then did a two-year stint in 2000 with Comcast SportsNet Philadelphia, where he served as an anchor on SportsNite as well as intermission reporter for the Philadelphia Flyers. In 2002, Hanson moved to sister network Comcast SportsNet Mid-Atlantic in Bethesda, Maryland, where he served as a main anchor and reporter.  There, Hanson was reunited with his former WFTS-TV colleague Sage Steele, who joined CSN Mid-Atlantic a year earlier (2001).

In 2006, Hanson left CSN Mid-Atlantic to join the NFL Network, where he serves as a reporter, anchor, and host.

As of 2022, Hanson is a National Correspondent and host of NFL Network's show, NFL RedZone which he debuted in Fall of 2009. On Sundays he presents NFL coverage live for seven straight hours from 1:00-8:00 PM EST with no commercial breaks. On Mondays, he hosts Up to the Minute looking at NFL games from the previous week along with a preview of the Monday Night Football matchup. In addition, Hanson also co-anchors NFL Total Access during the week.

In 2015, Hanson served as the blow-by-blow announcer for Spike TV's Premier Boxing Champions series.

Hanson has served as in-stadium host for 14-straight Super bowls, usually serving when the broadcast cuts to commercial break.

Personal life
Hanson lives in Florida. He grew up in a religious home but was a skeptic before he converted to Christianity. Hanson has gone on to mission trips from the Missionaries of Charity in Mauritania, Nairobi, and locally in Los Angeles.

In 2014, Hanson volunteered with Orphan Outreach in Russia for a week and a half during the NFL off-season.

References

External links
 NFL RedZone
 NFL Network
 
Hanson on 'Cuse Conversations Podcast in 2021

Living people
American television personalities
Male television personalities
1971 births
S.I. Newhouse School of Public Communications alumni
National Football League announcers
People from Rochester, Michigan
Syracuse Orange football players